Hichem Mokhtar (born in Relizane) is an Algerian footballer who plays for Saudi Arabian club Al-Najma.

Club career
In summer 2010, Mokhtari signed a four year contract with USM Blida. On October 2, 2010, he made his professional debut for the club as a starter in a league game against CA Bordj Bou Arréridj.

On April 30, 2011, Mokhtari was a starter in USM Blida's triumph in the 2011 Algerian Junior Cup Final against ES Sétif.

On 26 June 2022, Mokhtar joined Saudi club Al-Najma.

Honours
 Won the 2011 Algerian Junior Cup with USM Blida

References

External links
 
 DZFoot Profile

Living people
Algerian footballers
Algerian Ligue Professionnelle 1 players
Saudi Second Division players
People from Relizane
USM Blida players
USM Alger players
MC Mekhadma players
MC Oran players
RC Relizane players
Al-Najma SC players
Association football forwards
Year of birth missing (living people)
21st-century Algerian people
Algerian expatriate footballers
Expatriate footballers in Saudi Arabia
Algerian expatriate sportspeople in Saudi Arabia